Neleides or Nelides (  (Nηλείδης); also Neleiades (Νηληιάδης), Neleius, and in the plural Neleidae) was a patronymic of ancient Greece derived from Neleus, son of the Greek god Poseidon, and was used to refer to his descendants.  In literature, this name typically designated either Nestor, the son of Neleus, or Antilochus, his grandson.  One notable offshoot of this family line was the Alcmaeonidae.

Notes

References

 
Pylian characters in Greek mythology